Robina railway station is located on the Gold Coast line in Queensland, Australia. It serves the Gold Coast suburb of Robina.

History
Robina station opened on 31 May 1998 when the Gold Coast line was extended from Nerang. It served at the terminus of the line until it was extended to Varsity Lakes in December 2009.

North of the station lies a stabling yard, which will be expanded as part of the New Generation Rollingstock project.

Services
Robina is served by Gold Coast line services from Varsity Lakes to Bowen Hills, Doomben and Brisbane Airport Domestic.

Services by platform

Transport links
Surfside Buslines operate eight routes via Robina station:
747: to Southport bus station
750: to Broadbeach South Interchange via Bond University
751: to Broadbeach South Interchange via Mermaid Waters
752: Robina Town Centre to Broadbeach South Interchange via Robina and Mermaid Waters
755: Robina Town Centre bus station to Broadbeach South Interchange via Merrimac
758: Robina Town Centre to Merrimac via Mudgeeraba
759: to Reedy Creek
760: to Tweed Heads via Gold Coast Airport

NSW TrainLink operates a coach service to Casino that connects with an XPT service to Sydney.

References

External links

Robina station Queensland Rail
Robina station Queensland's Railways on the Internet

Railway stations in Australia opened in 1998
Railway stations in Gold Coast City
Robina, Queensland